This is a list of Time Team episodes from series 4.

Episode

Series 4

Episode # refers to the air date order. The Time Team Specials are aired in between regular episodes, but are omitted from this list. Regular contributors on Time Team include: Tony Robinson (presenter); archaeologists Mick Aston, Phil Harding, Carenza Lewis; Beric Morley (historic buildings); Robin Bush (historian); Victor Ambrus (illustrator); Stewart Ainsworth (landscape investigator); John Gater, Chris Gaffney (geophysicists); Henry Chapman (surveyor); Sue Francis (graphics); Mark Corney (Roman expert).

References

External links
Time Team at Channel4.com
The Unofficial Time Team site Fan site

Time Team (Series 04)
1997 British television seasons